Adobe Animate (formerly Adobe Flash Professional, Macromedia Flash, and FutureSplash Animator) is a multimedia authoring and computer animation program developed by Adobe Inc.

Animate is used to design vector graphics and animation for television series, online animation, websites, web applications, rich web applications, game development, commercials, and other interactive projects. The program also offers support for raster graphics, rich text,  audio video embedding, and ActionScript 3.0 scripting. Animations may be published for HTML5, WebGL, Scalable Vector Graphics (SVG) animation and spritesheets, and legacy Flash Player (SWF) and Adobe AIR formats. The developed projects also extend to applications for Android, iOS, Windows Desktop and MacOS.

It was first released in 1996 as FutureSplash Animator, and then renamed Macromedia Flash upon its acquisition by Macromedia. It served as the main authoring environment for the Adobe Flash platform, vector-based software for creating animated and interactive content. It was renamed Adobe Animate in 2016 to more accurately reflect its market position then, since over a third of all content created in Animate uses HTML5.

History

The first version of Adobe Flash/Adobe Animate was FutureSplash Animator, a vector graphics and vector animations program released in May 1996. FutureSplash Animator was developed by FutureWave Software, a small software company whose first product, SmartSketch, was a vector-based drawing program for pen-based computers. With the implosion of the pen-oriented operating systems, it was ported to Microsoft Windows as well as Apple Inc.'s Classic Mac OS. In 1995, the company decided to add animation abilities to their product and to create a vector-based animation platform for World Wide Web; hence FutureSplash Animator was created. (At that time, the only way to deploy such animations on the web was through the use of Java.) The FutureSplash animation technology was used on websites such as MSN, The Simpsons website and Disney Daily Blast of The Walt Disney Company.

In December 1996, Macromedia bought FutureWave and rebranded the product as Macromedia Flash, a brand name that continued for 8 major versions. Adobe Systems acquired Macromedia in 2005, and re-branded the product Adobe Flash Professional to distinguish it from the player, Adobe Flash Player. It was included as part of the Creative Suite of products from CS3 to CS6, until Adobe phased out the Creative Suite lineup in favor of Creative Cloud (CC).

On December 1, 2015, Adobe announced that the program would be renamed Adobe Animate on its next major update. The move comes as part of an effort to disassociate the program from Adobe Flash Player, acknowledging its increased use for authoring HTML5 and video content, and an effort to begin discouraging the use of Flash Player in favor of web standards-based solutions. The first version under the new name was released February 8, 2016. Although Adobe Animate is moving towards web-standard file formats, Flash (.swf) and Air (.air) formats are still officially supported. On June 16, 2020, as part of Adobe's 'Evolving Brand Identity', Adobe Animate unveiled a complete redesign of its logo in which, for the first time in almost 20 years, the main color was changed—from red to purple.

Versions

See also
 Flash animation
 List of Adobe Flash animated television series
 List of Adobe Flash animated films
 Animaker
 Vyond

References

External links
 

1996 software
2D animation software
Flash Professional
Adobe Flash
Flash
Animation software
C++ software
Cross-platform software
Graphics file formats
Macintosh multimedia software
Flash
MacOS multimedia software
Vector graphics editors
Web development software
Windows graphics-related software
Windows multimedia software
New media